Caroline Fiona Ellen Nokes (née Perry; born 26 June 1972) is a British Conservative Party politician. She was first elected as the Member of Parliament (MP) for Romsey and Southampton North in Hampshire in the 2010 general election. Elected as a Conservative, Nokes had the Conservative whip removed on 3 September 2019 and sat as an independent politician until the whip was restored to her on 29 October.

From 2014 to 2015 she was a Parliamentary Private Secretary to Mark Harper at the Department for Work and Pensions. Nokes served in Theresa May's government as Parliamentary Under-Secretary of State for Welfare Delivery at the Department for Work and Pensions from 2016 to 2017, Parliamentary Secretary for the Cabinet Office from 2017 to 2018, and as Minister of State for Immigration at the Home Office from January 2018 to July 2019.

Early life and career
Nokes was born at Lyndhurst Hospital in Lyndhurst, and raised in West Wellow, a village in Hampshire. The daughter of Roy Perry, a former Conservative Member of the European Parliament (MEP) for the Wight and Hampshire South constituency, she was educated at The Romsey School, La Sagesse Convent in Romsey and then Peter Symonds' College, Winchester, before reading politics at the University of Sussex from 1991 to 1994.

After her graduation Nokes became a policy adviser to her father, in his role as a MEP. Prior to her election she was chief executive of the National Pony Society, an animal welfare charity promoting and supporting the traditional native breeds of ponies through education, training and competition.

Nokes was a member of Test Valley Borough Council from 1999 until 2010, representing the Romsey Extra ward, and for some time was responsible for the leisure portfolio. She stood down as a councillor when she was elected to parliament in May 2010.

Nokes stood unsuccessfully as the Conservative parliamentary candidate for the Southampton Itchen constituency at the 2001 general election, and for the Romsey constituency at the 2005 general election.

Parliamentary career
Nokes was elected at the 2010 general election as the Member of Parliament (MP) for the new constituency of Romsey and Southampton North, defeating former Liberal Democrat MP Sandra Gidley by 4,165 votes. The prior Romsey constituency, held by Gidley, had disappeared due to boundary changes. Nokes made her maiden speech on 17 June 2010, on the subject of a high-skilled economy.

In June 2014, Nokes was independently assessed as leading the UK's 650 MPs in alacrity in responding to constituents, with a response rate of 100%. The data was analysed by think-tank mySociety, who commended Nokes as the most "responsive MP" in Parliament, based on over 58,000 responses to 96,000 messages sent to MPs.

In July 2014, Nokes became a Parliamentary Private Secretary at the Department for Work and Pensions, as an aide to the minister with responsibility for disabled people.

Nokes is a member of the Armed Forces Parliamentary Scheme, spoke in 37 separate debates in the 12 months to March 2013, and has an above-average voting record. She lists her particular interests as international development, sport, the equine industry, the environment, energy, animal welfare, family law, local government and planning. She has spoken in debates on planning policy, reforming the Child Support Agency Family Based Agreements, adoption, and the closure of the Ford motor manufacturing plant in her constituency. She has also introduced legislation on dangerous dogs, and in January 2011, the Consumer Protection Bill.

Although consistently voting to employ UK military forces overseas, Nokes has voted against the strengthening of the Military Covenant. Nokes has voted against requiring public bodies to take into account armed service personnel's records when setting healthcare, education and housing policy. She also voted against putting the covenant into law.

Parliamentary select committees and all-party groups
Nokes was until March 2015 a member of two parliamentary select committees, the Environmental Audit Select Committee, and the Education Select Committee. She is a member of a parliamentary group for equine welfare. In October 2012, Nokes became an officer of the All-Party Parliamentary Group (APPG) on Body Image, which campaigns to raise awareness of body image, eating disorders, nutrition and health issues within the advertising industry, the health and fitness sector, media, youth organisations and Government. It went on to play a fundamental role in the foundation of YMCA's "Be Real" campaign. Nokes gave up the position on the APPG for Body Image in 2016.

Parliamentary bill committees
Nokes sat on the Scrap Metal Dealers Bill Committee, and was a member of the Justice and Security Bill Committee. She also sat on the Children and Families Bill Committee which scrutinises a bill designed to improve legislation affecting fostered and adopted children, children in care, children with Special Educational Needs, and the family justice system. Nokes was also a member of the Deregulation Bill Committee and the Modern Slavery Bill Committee, a subject in which she had previously expressed a constituency interest and on which she had questioned the government.

Equatorial Guinea 
In August 2011, Nokes joined a parliamentary delegation to Equatorial Guinea, an African country criticised for its human rights record. The decision to visit the country was criticised by Labour MP Paul Flynn. Others commended the delegation for its bravery in going, and for publishing a balanced report which was critical of the regime. Nokes said her decision to go was because Amnesty International were no longer active in the country, and information about Equatorial Guinea was possibly outdated. The delegation had Foreign Office support, and was asked to assess if historic reports of the country were still valid. The delegation met with the country's Prime Minister, whom the delegation challenged about the country's human rights record. Nokes went on to call for the country's president to instigate proper democracy and permit press freedom.

Home Office Minister of State
In January 2018, Nokes was appointed Minister of State for Immigration at the Home Office, a Cabinet position. Accordingly, she was appointed to the Privy Council. She was criticised by the Northern Ireland Affairs Select Committee after admitting she had not read the Good Friday Agreement. She was removed by new Prime Minister Boris Johnson on 25 July 2019; she found this out when the journalist John Stevens tweeted "Caroline Nokes sacked".

Removal and restoration of whip 

Nokes was opposed to Brexit prior to the 2016 EU membership referendum. Nokes had the Conservative whip removed on 3 September 2019, after she voted against the party to extend the deadline for Britain to exit the European Union and prevent a no-deal Brexit, stating that her constituents in Romsey and Southampton North would be worse off under a no-deal Brexit.

She was among 10 MPs who had the whip restored on 29 October 2019.

Chair of the Women and Equalities Select Committee 
On 29 January 2020, Nokes was elected to the position of chair of the Women and Equalities Committee, succeeding Maria Miller.

In May 2021, alongside celebrities and other public figures, Nokes was a signatory to an open letter from Stylist magazine which called on the government to address what it described as an "epidemic of male violence" by funding an "ongoing, high-profile, expert-informed awareness campaign on men’s violence against women and girls".

Same-sex marriage
Nokes has stated she was "broadly supportive" of same-sex marriage, provided that religious organisations were not forced to act against their theology. In February 2013, she cited her support for stable and secure relationships, both gay and straight, but also referenced her previous pledge to Christians, and voted against the Marriage (Same Sex Couples) Bill at Second Reading, saying she was "not convinced the safeguards sought by the Church of England have been guaranteed".

Despite originally voting against extending same-sex marriage to England and Wales in 2013, Nokes later apologised in 2020 for doing so, stating that she would "take her vote back in a heartbeat."

Planning policy
Nokes was a member of the Southern Area Planning Committee on Test Valley Borough Council for 10 years and was a critic of a number of developments in the Test Valley area, in particular where plans to develop were not subject to a proper environmental survey. She is a regular speaker on planning issues, advocate for greater planning controls to protect green field spaces, and to better manage planning in rural areas. Nokes criticised the National Planning Policy Framework, saying "communities need to be treated differently. Good quality affordable housing is of course the key issue, but so is sympathetic development and ensuring the rural economy can grow through planning regulations which do not disadvantage rural business". She criticised the Government for "not delivering localism" and said the most important aspect of planning "is the voice of the local resident".

Fathers4Justice
In April 2010, Fathers4Justice members backed Nokes as the Conservatives had supported their campaign for change to family law, promising legislation if they won the 2010 general election. Following the formation of the coalition, government policy did not fully reflect the position of Fathers4Justice, and the group criticised the new government. In March 2013, when Nokes announced she would sit on the committee responsible for scrutinising the bill, Fathers4Justice called upon her to resign.

Following many abusive tweets directed at Nokes, Twitter shut down the accounts of Fathers4Justice and its leader Matt O'Connor, which F4J saw as "political censorship". The local media reported the group had been engaged in a "witch hunt" against Nokes, who said she had "repeatedly offered to help Fathers4Justice with the tabling of amendments for the Children and Families Bill, but none were forthcoming, just comments, which Twitter agreed constituted abuse and harassment. I am aware other political parties and individuals have also complained to Twitter and indeed to the police". She also said: "I remain committed to improvements to the family justice system, which the Children and Families Bill goes some way towards delivering, and it is a pity F4J chose not to engage constructively with the deliberations of the Bill Committee".

Nokes' office said in 2013 that the harassment of the MP by Fathers4Justice was non-stop. Nokes herself was quoted in The Independent newspaper: "They ignored the warnings and carried on bullying, harassing and sending tweets indicating they were 'looking' for me at my home address at 10.30 at night". Matt O'Connor denied the accusation.

In February 2014, Nokes criticised a House of Lords amendment to the Children and Families Bill which she said "watered down" the commitment to shared parenting, and spoke against the amendment in the House of Commons, arguing that shared parenting arrangements were in the best interests of children.

In October 2014, The Independent reported allegations that the group might have put a tracking device on Nokes's car, and a security consultant said he had been approached by Matt O'Connor's wife Nadine O'Connor about placing the MP under surveillance. Police were said to regard the group as a "fixated threat" which led to security enhancements at Nokes's home. When O'Connor confronted the Hampshire Police and Crime Commissioner making allegations about Nokes, the commissioner said O'Connor had "made things up". A person claiming to be a supporter of the group later sent Nokes a Facebook message which stated the wish that Nokes be "violently raped", and stated "there are a lot of people who wish you serious harm, torture and death. Watch your back".

At the Central London County Court at the Royal Courts of Justice in October 2014, the judge refused to grant the injunction because of "a total absence of evidence", with the judge criticising the O'Connors for seeking to prejudice the court by making "generalised assertions" and concluding "there's no sufficient evidence before me to support a finding that there's even an arguable case for a claim for harassment." The O'Connors were ordered to pay costs.

Sexual assault allegation 
On 15 November 2021, Nokes accused Stanley Johnson, the father of then prime minister Boris Johnson, of inappropriately touching her at the Conservative Party conference in Blackpool in 2003. Stanley Johnson said that he had "no recollection of Caroline Nokes at all".

Personal life
She married Marc Nokes in 1995 and the couple had a daughter. In 2010 it was reported that Nokes had been having an affair with a Conservative councillor. Nokes divorced in 2012.

References

External links
 Profile at the Conservative Party
Romsey and Southampton North Conservatives

1972 births
Living people
Female members of the Parliament of the United Kingdom for English constituencies
Conservative Party (UK) MPs for English constituencies
Independent members of the House of Commons of the United Kingdom
People educated at Peter Symonds College
Alumni of the University of Sussex
UK MPs 2010–2015
UK MPs 2015–2017
UK MPs 2017–2019
UK MPs 2019–present
21st-century British women politicians
Female members of the Cabinet of the United Kingdom
21st-century English women
21st-century English people